Villarta de San Juan is a municipality in Ciudad Real, Castile-La Mancha, Spain. It belongs to the jurisdiction of Manzanares and bounded in the North Port Lápice, east of Heritage, the South Manzanares and the West with San Juan Arena .

According to the 2010 census the municipality has a population of 3,061 inhabitants.

Notable people
Tomás Pina (born 1987), professional footballer

References

External links

Ayuntamiento de Villarta de San Juan
Ciudad Real Tourism
Associación Tierra y Agua
Ruta Don Quijote

Municipalities in the Province of Ciudad Real